Shahid Mahdavi Stadium is a multi-use stadium in Bushehr, Iran. It is currently used for football matches and is the home stadium of Persian Gulf Pro League team Shahin Bushehr The stadium holds 15,000 people.

References

External links
Stadium information

Football venues in Iran
Buildings and structures in Bushehr Province
Sport in Bushehr Province